Minuscule 205 (in the Gregory-Aland numbering), δ 500 (Soden), 68 (Rahlfs), is a Greek minuscule manuscript of the Old and the New Testament, on parchment, from the 15th century. It has some marginalia.

Description 

The codex contains the text of the New Testament on 441 parchment leaves (size ). The order of the books: Gospels, Acts of the Apostles, Catholic epistles, Pauline epistles, and Apocalypse. It is written in one column per page, in 55-56 lines per page.

Text of Mark 16:9-20 is marked by an obelus.

It contains also the Old Testament (except Book of Daniel).

Text 

The Greek text of the codex is a representative of the Caesarean text-type in the Gospels and the Byzantine text-type in rest of books of the codex. Aland placed it in Category III in Gospels and Revelation, and in Category V in rest of books.

It is a member of the Family 1 in the Gospels. It creates a pair with 209.

History 

Paleographically it has been assigned to the 15th century. The manuscript was written by John Rhosus for Cardinal Bessarion († 1472), together with the codices 354 and 357. Rhosus was librarian of Cardinal. In 1468 it was sent to the library of Cardinal.

It was added to the list of the New Testament manuscripts by Griesbach.

It was examined by Birch and Burgon. G. F. Rinck considers it in the Gospels a mere copy of the codex 209. Burgon argued that both were transcribed from the same uncial archetype as codex 209. C. R. Gregory saw it in 1886.

It is currently housed at the Biblioteca Marciana (Gr. Z 5), at Venice, together with the 205abs, which was thought to be a copy of 205. However, more recently Welsby has demonstrated that 205 is in fact the copy and 205abs the original. 205abs is now known as minuscule 2886 in the Gregory-Aland classification.

See also 
 List of New Testament minuscules
 Septuagint manuscripts
 Biblical manuscript
 Textual criticism

References

Further reading 

 G. F. Rinck, Lucubratio critica in Acta Apostolorum, Epistolas catholicas et Paulinas, Sumtu Fel. Schneideri: Basilae 1830.
 Kirsopp Lake, Codex 1 of the Gospels and its Allies, Texts and Studies, VII 3 (Cambridge, 1902).

External links 

 Minuscule 205 at the INTF
 R. Waltz, Minuscule 205 at the Encyclopedia of Textual Criticism

Greek New Testament minuscules
15th-century biblical manuscripts
Septuagint manuscripts